The 2018 Hillingdon Council election took place on 3 May 2018 to elect members of Hillingdon Council in England. This was on the same day as other local elections. The Conservative Party retained control with an increased majority.

Overall results
The Conservatives retained control of the council, winning 44 seats (+2). Labour won 21 (−2).
Tony Burles was the only incumbent Councillor to lose his seat (Labour - Uxbridge South)

|}
  
Source

Results by ward

By-elections 
Hillingdon East – 27 February 2020 - Caused by resignation of Cllr Pat Jackson (Con) due to ill health

Charville – 6 May 2021 - Caused by death of Cllr Neil Fyfe (Con)

References

2018
2018 London Borough council elections